Naomi Rebecca Russell (born 8 June 1990 in Brisbane, Queensland) is an Australian gymnast.

Russell represented Australia in the 2006 Commonwealth Games. She won gold with the team and a bronze on vault.

Russell won the silver medal in the all-around competition at the 2006 Artistic Gymnastics Championships (Australian nationals) at the Sydney Olympic Park Sports Centre.

References

External links
Queensland Academy of Sport profile
Naomi Russell 2006 Commonwealth Games (Team Final) BARS  at YouTube

1990 births
Living people
Australian female artistic gymnasts
Commonwealth Games bronze medallists for Australia
Gymnasts at the 2006 Commonwealth Games
Commonwealth Games medallists in gymnastics
Medallists at the 2006 Commonwealth Games